Holbeck railway station was a railway station that served the district of Holbeck, in Leeds, West Yorkshire, England.

Overview
Holbeck Station was opened by the Leeds, Bradford and Halifax Junction Railway almost a year after the other stations were opened on the line. It was unusual in that it had platforms on two different levels, with Holbeck High Level (HL) being a joint Great Northern Railway and Lancashire and Yorkshire Railway venture and Holbeck Low Level (LL) which was a joint Midland and North Eastern Railway venture. The designations of High Level and Low Level were added by British Rail in 1951.

Holbeck was a cramped station and suffered from trains awaiting paths into the various Leeds termini after being held at junctions on the approaches to and from Leeds. Passengers on the Midland/NER lines would simply stay on the train and change to another at Wellington station. This accelerated the demise of Holbeck station well before the Beeching closures affected the other stations on the lines that it served.

The station was closed to the public in 1958. The route on which trains ran through Holbeck High Level station to Leeds Central station closed in 1967, with the tracks subsequently being lifted and the bridge carrying the high level track over the low level removed.

Trains running along the Airedale, Wharfedale and Harrogate lines still pass the site of Holbeck Low Level station on their way in and out of Leeds station, although there is no clear indication of the former station that existed there.

Accidents and incidents
On 27 July 1875, the boiler of a locomotive exploded.

See also
Holbeck Viaduct Project
List of closed railway lines in Great Britain
List of closed railway stations in Britain

References

Bibliography

Disused railway stations in Leeds
Railway stations in Great Britain opened in 1855
Railway stations in Great Britain closed in 1958